Oskar Matute García de Jalón (born 5 October 1972) is a Spanish politician and a member of the Congress of Deputies of Spain. He was previously a member of the Basque Parliament.

Early life
Matute was born on 5 October 1972 in Barakaldo, Basque Country. He grew up in Bilbao but currently lives in Barakaldo. He has degree in business studies from the University of the Basque Country.

Career
Matute was an activist in the movement against compulsory military service in Spain and the pacifist Elkarri movement. He was also a member of the Viento Sur and Ezker Gogoa foundations, and Lokarri and Euskadiko Langile Komisioak.

Matute was co-ordinator for the presidency of the United Left–Greens (Ezker Batua–Berdeak, EB–B) and the federal presidency of the United Left (IU). He became a member of the EB's executive representing the Ekaitza faction. Ekaitza had been formed in 1993 by those supporting Basque sovereignty, the right to self-determination, alternative social movements and citizen participation in political decisions. Following the 1998 Estella Pact (of which EB–B was a signatory), Ekaitza transformed into Batzen with Matute as its spokesperson. Matute was also a member of Espacio Alternativo (EA, Alternative Space), part of IU.

At the 2001 regional election Matute was placed 2nd on the EB–B's list of candidates in the Province of Biscay but the party only managed to win one seat in the province and as a result he failed to get elected to the Basque Parliament. However he was appointed to the Basque Parliament in January 2002 following the resignation of Javier Madrazo. At the 2005 regional election Matute was placed 2nd on the EB–B's list of candidates in the Province of Biscay but, again, the party only managed to win one seat in the province and as a result he failed to get re-elected to the Basque Parliament. However he was re-appointed to the Basque Parliament in July 2005 following the resignation of Javier Madrazo.

At the EB–B's 7th Assembly in June 2008, held at the Euskalduna Conference Centre and Concert Hall in Bilbao, Matute challenged incumbent Javier Madrazo for the party's general co-ordinator position but was defeated after only receiving 22% of the votes. Matute founded Alternatiba Eraikitzen (Alternative in Progress) a socio-political organisation which became the Alternatiba (Alternative) political party. He left EB–B in April 2009. Alternatiba joined Bildu when it was founded in 2011.

At the 2011 local elections Matute was placed 25th on the Bildu's list of candidates in Barakaldo but the alliance only managed to win four seats in the municipality and as a result he failed to get elected. He contested the 2012 regional election as an EH Bildu electoral alliance candidate in the Province of Biscay and was re-elected to the Basque Parliament.

Matute contested the 2016 general election as an EH Bildu candidate in the Province of Biscay and was elected to the Congress of Deputies. He resigned from the Basque Parliament in July 2016.  He was re-elected at the 2019 general election.

Matute is national spokesperson for Alternatiba and national co-speaker for EH Bildu.

Electoral history

References

External links

1972 births
Alternatiba (Basque political party) politicians
EH Bildu politicians
Living people
Members of the 7th Basque Parliament
Members of the 8th Basque Parliament
Members of the 10th Basque Parliament
Members of the 12th Congress of Deputies (Spain)
Members of the 13th Congress of Deputies (Spain)
People from Barakaldo
United Left–Greens politicians
University of the Basque Country alumni
Members of the 14th Congress of Deputies (Spain)